Knut Brynildsen (23 July 1917 — 15 January 1986) was a Norwegian footballer. Playing for the Norwegian national team between 1935–1940 and 1945–1948, he managed to score 10 goals in 18 caps. He participated at the 1938 FIFA World Cup.

On club level Brynildsen played for Fredrikstad, where he helped win the Norwegian cup in 1935, 1936, 1938 and 1940, and the league title in 1938, 1939 og 1949.

References

Norwegian footballers
Norway international footballers
1917 births
1986 deaths
1938 FIFA World Cup players
Fredrikstad FK players
Norwegian resistance members

Association football forwards